Leonard William Walter Richardson (14 July 1881 – 14 May 1955) was a South African long-distance runner. He competed at the 1912, 1920 and the 1924 Summer Olympics.

References

1881 births
1955 deaths
Athletes (track and field) at the 1912 Summer Olympics
Athletes (track and field) at the 1920 Summer Olympics
Athletes (track and field) at the 1924 Summer Olympics
South African male long-distance runners
Olympic athletes of South Africa
Place of birth missing
Olympic cross country runners